Mississauga Library is the public library system of Mississauga, Ontario. The system has 18 branches, consisting of the Mississauga Central Library and 17 smaller neighbourhood libraries.

Services
The Library offers many services and programs such as story times, March Break activities and a telephone dial-a-story service.  Resources range from advice to parents on choosing books to internet resources for kids.
Information and reference services 
Access to full text databases 
Community information 
Internet access 
Reader's advisory services 
Programs for children, youth and adults 
 Delivery to homebound individuals
 Interlibrary loan
 Free downloadable audiobooks
 e-books 
 Exam proctoring

The library system will eliminate late fees in 2022.

Central Library 

The Mississauga Central Library is located in the city centre at 301 Burnhamthorpe Road West, adjacent to the Mississauga Civic Centre. It is the largest branch of the Mississauga Library System, containing four floors of materials and a further floor for silent study, and has functioned as the main library for the system since its opening in 1991.

It was officially renamed to Hazel McCallion Central Library on 10 February 2021 (and affectionately nicknamed "Hazy Mac") in honour of the centennial birthday of the city's former mayor Hazel McCallion.

Branches

See also 
 Ontario Public Libraries
 Ask Ontario

References

External links 
 

Public libraries in Ontario
Library System, Mississauga
Buildings and structures in the Regional Municipality of Peel
Education in the Regional Municipality of Peel
Library buildings completed in 1991
1991 establishments in Ontario